Orval Howard Hansen (August 3, 1926 – November 2, 2017) was an American politician who served as a congressman from Idaho. He served three terms as a Republican in the House from 1969 to 1975, representing the state's 2nd district.

Early years
Born in Firth, Idaho to Lily Dorothy Miriam (née Wahlquist) and Farrel L. Hansen, his mother the daughter of Swedish immigrants and his father of Danish descent. Hansen was raised in Idaho Falls and graduated from Idaho Falls High School in 1944. After military service in World War II, he attended the University of Idaho in Moscow, where he was a member of Phi Beta Kappa, Sigma Chi fraternity, and extremely active with campus activities. Hansen earned a B.A. summa cum laude in 1950 from UI and then attended George Washington University in Washington, D.C. and received a J.D. from its Law School in 1954.  He also earned an LLM (awarded in 1973) and a Ph.D. in political science (awarded in 1986) from GWU.

He served in the U.S. Navy from 1944 to 1946, including one year in the Pacific on the aircraft carrier , and was a member of the U.S. Air Force Reserve until his retirement as a lieutenant colonel in 1978.

Political career
Hansen's political career began in the state legislature, where he served four terms in the House, beginning in 1956.  He served as House Majority Leader from 1961 to 1962. In his first run for Congress in 1962, he won the GOP nomination in a June  but lost the general election to incumbent Ralph Harding. He returned to the Idaho House for another two-year term, followed by one term in the state senate.

He served three terms before being ousted in the 1974 Republican primary in August by the man he succeeded six years earlier, George Hansen (no relation). (George Hansen had vacated the seat in 1968 to run for the U.S. Senate, but lost to incumbent Frank Church.) U.S. Senator Mike Crapo got his first taste of Washington politics as an intern for Orval Hansen during the summer of 1972.

Following his service in Congress, Hansen returned to private law practice, and founded the Columbia Institute for Political Research in 1977.

Personal
Hansen was married to the former June Duncan of Southport, England; they have seven children.  In 2006, Hansen's son Jim D. Hansen won the Democratic nomination for the 2nd district seat, but was defeated by incumbent Mike Simpson.

Hansen died at his home in Boise on November 2, 2017, of complications from cancer at the age of 91.

References

External links 

1926 births
2017 deaths
20th-century American politicians
Latter Day Saints from Idaho
United States Navy personnel of World War II
American people of Danish descent
American people of Swedish descent
Deaths from cancer in Idaho
George Washington University Law School alumni
Idaho lawyers
Republican Party Idaho state senators
Republican Party members of the Idaho House of Representatives
People from Idaho Falls, Idaho
Republican Party members of the United States House of Representatives from Idaho
United States Air Force officers
United States Air Force reservists
United States Navy officers
University of Idaho alumni